The 2010 Lucas Oil Slick Mist 200 was the 1st stock car race of the 2010 ARCA Racing Series season, and the 49th iteration of the event. The race was held on Saturday, February 6, 2010, in Daytona Beach, Florida at the Daytona International Speedway, a 2.5-mile (4.0 km) permanent tri-oval shaped superspeedway. The race took the scheduled 80 laps to complete. At race's end, Bobby Gerhart, driving for his own team, Bobby Gerhart Racing, would take home the victory, after dominating a majority of the race, leading 51 laps. This was Gerhart's 7th career ARCA Racing Series win, his sixth at Daytona, and his first of the season. To fill out the podium, Mark Thompson and John Wes Townley, both driving for Venturini Motorsports, would finish 2nd and 3rd, respectively.

This race was mostly known as the stock car debut for Danica Patrick, as she was making her transition from IndyCar to NASCAR. With Patrick entered into the race, it became the most viewed ARCA event in series history, with 2.4 million viewers tuning into the Speed Network. Along with Patrick, Nelson Piquet Jr., the former Formula 1 driver, would also make his debut into stock cars.

The race would also make more history, as six total female drivers were entered into the race (Alli Owens, Jennifer Jo Cobb, Jill George, Danica Patrick, Leilani Munter, and Milka Duno), the most in a single ARCA race.

Background 

Daytona International Speedway is a race track in Daytona Beach, Florida, United States. Since opening in 1959, it has been the home of the Daytona 500, the most prestigious race in NASCAR as well as its season opening event. In addition to NASCAR, the track also hosts races of ARCA, AMA Superbike, IMSA, SCCA, and Motocross. The track's  infield includes the  Lake Lloyd, which has hosted powerboat racing. The speedway is operated by NASCAR pursuant to a lease with the City of Daytona Beach on the property that runs until 2054. Dale Earnhardt is Daytona International Speedway's all-time winningest driver, with a total of 34 career victories (12- Daytona 500 Qualifying Races) (7- NASCAR Xfinity Series Races) (6- Busch Clash Races) (6- IROC Races) (2- Pepsi 400 July Races) (1- The 1998 Daytona 500).

The track was built in 1959 by NASCAR founder William "Bill" France Sr. to host racing that was held at the former Daytona Beach Road Course. His banked design permitted higher speeds and gave fans a better view of the cars. Lights were installed around the track in 1998, and today it is the third-largest single-lit outdoor sports facility. The speedway has been renovated four times, with the infield renovated in 2004 and the track repaved in 1978 and 2010. The track is 50 miles north of Orlando.

Entry list 

 (R) denotes rookie driver

December testing 

Nearly two months before the race, ARCA would have a three-day testing session, which lasted from Friday, December 18, 2009, through Sunday, December 20. The sessions would mainly last for a few hours. The first session was held on Friday, but would only last for 35 minutes, due to inclement weather. Despite only running four laps at full speed, Danica Patrick would drive a stock car for the first time in her career. She would rank 12th overall in the session. Another notable driver that made laps during the session was Narain Karthikeyan, who was the first Indian driver to compete in Formula 1. Karthikeyan placed 17th overall. Kile was followed by his teammates, Steve Arpin and Alli Owens, who were 2nd and 3rd quickest. 20-year-old Brandon McReynolds, the son of veteran NASCAR crew chief, Larry McReynolds, recorded the 4th position. Joey Coulter, driving for his family team, rounded out the top five. The rest of the top ten consisted of Bryan Silas, Nick Igdalsky, Lance Fenton, Grant Enfinger, and Matt Lofton.

The second session would be held on Saturday, and would go the full distance, with 61 drivers competing in it. By virtue of just starting the session, Milka Duno became the first Hispanic woman to test an ARCA Racing Series car.

He was followed by the Venturini teammates, Mikey Kile, Steve Arpin, and Alli Owens, who ranked 2nd, 3rd, and 4th, respectively. Steve Blackburn rounded out the top five. The rest of the top ten included James Buescher, Matt Lofton, Bobby Gerhart, Joey Coulter, and Terry Jones.

The third and final session would be held on Sunday, also going the full distance, with 53 drivers that ran laps. Once again, Mikey Kile would post the second quickest time, with Bryan Silas recording third place. Alli Owens and Patrick Sheltra would round out the top five. The rest of the top ten included Steve Arpin, Terry Jones, Joey Coulter, Jason Bowles, and Danica Patrick.

Practice and qualifying 

The official practice session was held on February 4, 2010, and would last for nearly five hours. Mikey Kile and Mark Thompson, teammates at Venturini Motorsports, recorded the 2nd and 3rd fastest times. Frank Kimmel, the nine-time ARCA Racing Series champion, scored the 8th quickest time. The five-time ARCA winner at Daytona, Bobby Gerhart, was 18th fastest overall.

Patrick Sheltra, the Florida native, earned the sixth fastest time.

"Our PowerTrac Dodge is really good," stated Sheltra. "We didn't have to play with it a whole lot today. The car handles well all by itself and the little drafting we did today, I didn't have one complaint. We're going to qualify somewhere between eighth and 12th, I think tomorrow but come race day, we're going to have a shot at winning this thing. I just have to thank Jon and all of the guys for working real hard. I'm really looking forward to the rest of the weekend."

Danica Patrick, who brought most of the media attention during the session, posted the 17th fastest time overall.

"I think today's practice was a success," stated Patrick. "I felt that the #7 GoDaddy.com car got stronger and more comfortable the more runs I made.  We have been working hard to get to this point, so hopefully tomorrow's qualifying run goes well."

Along with Patrick, five female drivers also made laps during practice, including Alli Owens, who was 13th quickest, Leilani Munter, who was 32nd, Milka Duno, who was 44th, Jennifer Jo Cobb, who was 47th, and Jill George, who was 50th.

Qualifying would be held on February 5.

"I knew the car was going to be fast because we were fast yesterday. I wasn't sure how the wind changing around was going to affect everyone else. You could definitely feel the wind blowing.  We don't want to mess the car up so we're not going to participate in happy hour. I've actually never done the happy hour practice in any speedway race. They tend to wreck a couple of cars in that practice and I don't want to risk it." stated Buescher. He also describes how it was like to race alongside Danica Patrick.

"She's just another driver in the field and that's how you have to look at it. Hopefully everyone in our race stays smart and no one over drives while trying to impress the large audience we have for this race. They showed us a crash video during the driver's meeting yesterday and it got our attention. I think there were 3 or 4 wrecks ahead of me in this race last year that I was able to avoid so hopefully my heart won't skip too many beats this year."

Mikey Kile, who was fastest out of 60 drivers that competed in the December testing sessions, earned the 2nd place starting position. "I've probably run over 1000 laps in my mind in between the December test and this race weekend," stated Kile. "We were hoping for a pole award today but with our qualifying draw and the wind and everything this is the way it worked out. We worked really hard during the off season and this qualifying result is a direct result of that hard work.  The car drafts well and drives well so I'm looking forward to getting the race started. We might go out there and make some single car runs later, but we don't want to draft. We watched the Cup practice yesterday and we don't want to risk messing up our best piece. It's just not worth it."

Joey Coulter, driving for his family team, posted the 3rd place starting spot. "I think we all thought we were going to be a little bit quicker but we are thrilled with the way we ran," stated Coulter. "It was consistent with our practice session yesterday and anytime you can keep consistent that's good. I'm definitely looking forward to tomorrow because I think my car will probably race better than it qualified—at least that's the goal. We'll probably just run a few laps in drafting practice later today."

Dakoda Armstrong and Bryan Silas would round out the top five. The rest of the top ten would include Mark Thompson, Nelson Piquet Jr., Bobby Gerhart, John Wes Townley, and Steve Arpin. Patrick Sheltra and Danica Patrick would both get the same lap time of 50.059. Sheltra would take the 11th spot based on 2009 owners points.

The following drivers would fail to qualify for the race: Lance Fenton, Matt Lofton, Greg Sarff, Scott Stenzel, Brad Lloyd, Chuck Walker, Jerick Johnson, Kyle Martel, and Mike Holt.

A second practice session was scheduled to be held after qualifying, but after periods of non-stop rain, it would be cancelled.

Starting lineup

Race

Race summary 

The race officially began on February 6, at 4:30 pm EST. Buescher and Kile would lead the field to the green flag. The first caution came on lap seven, for a multiple car incident, also known as "The Big One". Bill Baird would get loose coming into turn two, eventually causing him to hit the outside wall head-on. Steve Blackburn, with nowhere to go, would slam into the side of Baird's car. As they came back down on the track, more cars continued to pile in. Smoke had built up from the wreck, causing confusion for drivers and spotters.  Because of this, more drivers would be involved in it. A total of nine drivers would be involved in the incident.

The race would resume on lap 17, but shortly after, the caution would fly again. Dakoda Armstrong would blow a tire coming into turn one, causing him to spin through the grass. As he came back on to the track, he would get t-boned by Craig Goess. Both drivers would be out of the race.

The race resumed on lap 25. Once again, the caution would come out two laps later. Jesse Smith would blow a tire and hit the outside wall coming out of turn three. Jill George, who was trying to avoid the wreck, would get sideways in turn four, causing her to flip into the outside wall. Her car suffered significant damage. George was able to climb out the car under her own power.

The race would be red flagged for nearly 30 minutes to clean up the damage. After staying out on pit road, Bobby Gerhart would take the lead away from James Buescher, who led every lap during all of the cautions. The field would restart on lap 32. They would run about 10 laps before the fourth caution of the day came out, which had two separate incidents. The first one involved Nick Igdalsky, after he got loose and spun in turn two. The second one involved two drivers, Frank Kimmel and Mikey Kile. Kimmel would get spun from behind by Nelson Piquet Jr., and Mikey Kile would get spun from behind by Bryan Silas.

The race resumed just a little past the halfway point, on lap 46. Danica Patrick, the driver who was on the spotlight throughout the race, brought out the fifth caution. After Sean Corr and Piquet Jr. made contact in turn four, Patrick went to the inside lane and made it three wide. Piquet would then force Patrick off of the track and through the grass, eventually coming back across the track and spinning. Surprisingly, she would be able to save the car and avoid hitting the wall.

"I came down and went straight to the grass, and I thought, "Grass is not good for grip,"" Patrick said after the race. "I came back on the track sideways, and I took my hands off the wheel, and Tony Jr. was screaming at me to get back into it, so I hit the gas, then it caught."

The caution would come back out with 22 laps to go, for a violent crash involving Barry Fitzgerald. Coming out of turn two, Nelson Piquet Jr., the driver who was responsible for the last two cautions, would spin Fitzgerald from behind, causing him to spin towards the inside of the racetrack. Fitzgerald would flip multiple times, eventually coming to a rest on all four tires. Fitzgerald would climb out of the car under his own power.

The field restarted with 17 laps to go. With 14 to go, Steve Arpin would make side contact with Joey Coulter, causing him to get loose. They were trying to get around Nelson Piquet Jr., who was a lap down. As Arpin tried to correct himself, he would once again make contact with Coulter. Arpin moved Coulter down the racetrack, making major contact with Piquet. Piquet was able to go down pit road, as Coulter would drive through the grass and attempt to get back on the track. Ultimately, the caution did not come out.

With three laps to go, another incident would occur. Nick Igdalsky and Terry Jones would made contact in turn one, with Jones eventually blowing a tire coming into turn three. Shortly after that, Alli Owens and Darrell Basham would spin in turn four. However, the caution did not come out, as both drivers were below the racing surface when they spun. 

Bobby Gerhart would be able to hold off the field, and took home the checkered flag. It was his sixth victory at Daytona, making him have the most wins at Daytona in the ARCA Racing Series.

"We've had this plan in place for months," stated Gerhart. "We stuck to our plan, followed through and it worked. We knew we wanted to pit early. We were thinking lap 12 if there was a caution. But the caution came on lap 13 and they opened the pits on lap 14; that's when we came."

Mark Thompson, driving for Venturini Motorsports, would finish in the 2nd spot. His teammate, John Wes Townley, finished 3rd. The pole winner, James Buescher, came in 4th, with Patrick Sheltra rounding out the top five. Danica Patrick, making her stock car debut, would finish an impressive 6th, in a photo finish with Ricky Carmichael. "I was just kind of hanging out there for most of the race," stated Patrick. "There were lots of yellows. It feels to me like I got bumped a little bit in turns one and two. I just held to the yellow line because I know that you're not supposed to go below the yellow line to advance your position and I took myself out unfortunately. I was pretty excited to go from last to the top five. I felt pretty good, I was going side-by-side with people. And then at the end I was running eighth and I thought what the heck so I pulled out of the line and ran high. You can see I was racing by all of the marks on the car. The GoDaddy.com Chevrolet doesn't look very pretty." Tommy Joe Martins, Bryan Silas, and Steve Arpin would round out the top ten, respectively.

ARCA's rise to popularity 
During race, ARCA would break numerous records. Because of Danica Patrick's stock car debut, a total of over 118,000 fans were in attendance, making it the most attended ARCA race in history. ARCA's website received 715,721 pageviews, which broke their previous record with 211,776. 2.4 million viewers tuned into the Speed Network for the race, which was the most viewed ARCA race in history. Because of this, ARCA received a lot more media attention and popularity from the fans.

Race results

Standings after the race 

Drivers' Championship standings

Note: Only the first 10 positions are included for the driver standings.

References

External links 

ARCA Menards Series races
NASCAR races at Daytona International Speedway
February 2010 sports events in the United States
2010 in sports in Florida